Uebel or Übel or Ubel may refer to:

People
 Brandon Ubel (born 1991), American professional basketball player
 Ernst Uebel (1882 - 1959), German composer and musician
 Lars Uebel (born 1980) German tennis player and coach
 Michael Uebel (born 1964), American psychotherapist
 Thomas Uebel (born 1952), Austrian philosopher of science

Other
 F. Arthur Uebel, German clarinet maker
 Übel Blatt, a 2004 Japanese manga series